The Shining Hour is a 1938 American romantic drama film directed by Frank Borzage, based on the 1934 play 
The Shining Hour by Keith Winter, and starring Joan Crawford and Margaret Sullavan. The supporting cast of the MGM film features Robert Young, Melvyn Douglas, Fay Bainter and Hattie McDaniel.

Plot 
Olivia Riley (Joan Crawford), a New York City nightclub dancer, tires of the fast life and consents to marry Henry Linden (Melvyn Douglas), a wealthy farmer from Wisconsin.  Even before they engage to be married, however, Henry's brother David (Robert Young) is sent to New York by their domineering sister Hannah (Fay Bainter) to dissuade him from marrying Olivia. In private, Olivia slaps David when her integrity is questioned, but she marries Henry because she says he's the only person in her life who is endlessly positive.  When Olivia moves to her new husband's farm in Wisconsin, she encounters trouble from her sister-in-law Hannah, who does not approve of her. Olivia finds an ally in David's wife, Judy (Margaret Sullavan), who is in a loveless marriage.

Olivia comes to realize that she and Judy are in the same situation. Olivia's situation is further complicated when David defends her from the unwanted advances of a farm hand and he begins to fall in love with her. Henry is unaware of this, but Hannah finds out what is going on, and in a drunken rage she sets fire to the house that's being built for Henry and Olivia. Olivia saves a badly burned Judy, and David realizes he has loved Judy after all. Olivia then decides to leave the farm; and, as she drives away, Henry joins her and they leave together.

Cast
 Joan Crawford as Olivia Riley
 Margaret Sullavan as Judy Linden 
 Robert Young as David Linden 
 Melvyn Douglas as Henry Linden 
 Fay Bainter as Hannah Linden 
 Allyn Joslyn as Roger Q. Franklin 
 Hattie McDaniel as Belvedere 
 Oscar O'Shea as Charlie Collins 
 Frank Albertson as Benny Collins
 Harry Barris as Bertie

Box office
According to MGM records, the film earned $942,000 in the U.S. and Canada and $425,000 in other markets, realizing for the studio a total box office of $1,367,000. Those receipts, less the production's cited budget of $1,068,000, resulted in a profit of $299,000 for MGM.

References

External links

 
 
 
 

1938 films
1938 romantic drama films
American romantic drama films
American black-and-white films
Films scored by Franz Waxman
Films directed by Frank Borzage
American films based on plays
Films set in New York City
Films set in Wisconsin
Metro-Goldwyn-Mayer films
Films produced by Frank Borzage
Films produced by Joseph L. Mankiewicz
Films with screenplays by Jane Murfin
1930s English-language films
1930s American films